Chaograptis is a genus of moths of the family Noctuidae.

Species
 Chaograptis crystallodes Meyrick, 1902
 Chaograptis euchrysa Lower, 1903
 Chaograptis rhaptina Turner, 1904

References
 Chaograptis at Markku Savela's Lepidoptera and Some Other Life Forms
 Natural History Museum Lepidoptera genus database

Acontiinae